The 1914–15 English football season was the 27th season in the Football League for Aston Villa.

In September, Villa lost the Birmingham Charity Cup 2-3 to West Brom. In October Villa beat Newcastle. The teams had met 33 times in the league with 13 wins each and 7 draws.

Frank Moss joined First Division club Villa for a £250 fee in February 1914 and made two appearances during the following season, but he had to wait until after the First World War before he could resume his career. During the war, Moss guested for Bellis and Morcom, Aston Park Rangers, Smethwick Carriage Works and Bradford City.

"The Wellington Whirlwind," played as a centre forward for Aston Villa from 1904 to 1920.

Richard York had started his career with Handsworth Royal, Birchfield Rangers and the Royal Air Force, In March 1915 he joined Aston Villa as an amateur, signing professional forms in August 1919.

Table

References

External links
AVFC History: 1914–15 season

Aston Villa F.C. seasons
Aston Villa F.C.